Marius Broening (born 24 October 1983) is a German sprinter who specializes in the 100 metres.

He finished seventh in 4 x 100 m relay at the 2005 World Championships, together with teammates Alexander Kosenkow, Marc Blume and Tobias Unger and fifth at the 2006 European Championships with Kosenkow, Sebastian Ernst and Ronny Ostwald.

His personal best time is 10.30 seconds, achieved in July 2004 in Braunschweig.

References

1983 births
Living people
German male sprinters
European Athletics Championships medalists
Place of birth missing (living people)